Michael Vecchione (born February 25, 1993) is an American professional ice hockey center who is currently playing for the Hershey Bears of the American Hockey League (AHL) while under contract to the Washington Capitals of the National Hockey League (NHL).

Prior to turning professional, Vecchione played for Union College where he was named to the All-ECAC Rookie Team, ECAC Hockey All-Tournament Team All-ECAC Hockey Third Team, ECAC Player of the Year and AHCA East First-Team All-American during his four-year career.

Playing career

Early career
Vecchione began his youth hockey career with the Valley Junior Warriors in Saugus Youth Hockey program. While a member of the 1993 team, the Valley Junior Warriors won four state championships.

While attending Malden Catholic High School, Vecchione was drafted in the 2010 United States Hockey League (USHL) Draft by the Tri-City Storm. That season, as team captain, he led his team to the Super 8 state championship for the first time.

On August 21, 2012, while playing for the Storm, Vecchione committed to Union College for the 2013–14 season. He had previously been committed to the University of New Hampshire. On November 6, 2012, Vecchione was named an alternate captain for the Storm after assistant captain Heikki Liedes was injured.

Collegiate
In his freshman year at Union, Vecchione led the team rookies in scoring with 34 points in 38 games and ranked fourth across the ECAC. At the conclusion of the season, after having helped lead Union to their first NCAA Division 1 title, he was ranked ninth across the league in rookie scoring and was named to the All-ECAC Rookie Team. He was also named to the ECAC Hockey All-Academic Team and All-Tournament Team.

In his sophomore year, Vecchione was named an alternate captain in December. He led ECAC in assists with 31 in 39 games. Vecchione was selected for the Frozen Holiday Classic All-Tournament Team and was again named to the ECAC Hockey All-Academic Team while majoring in history.

Prior to his junior year, Vecchione was named a co-captain for Union alongside Matt Wilkins, becoming the first captain pairing for Union since 2008. He became the fastest player in Union Division I history to record 100 points when he recorded an assist against Princeton in his 96th career game on January 8, 2016. He became the 26th player in the program's Division 1 history to score 100 points. He was named to the All-ECAC Hockey Third Team on March 18 for the first time in his collegiate career. He ended the season with a team leading 29 points scored in 34 games.

In his last year with Union, Vecchione was again named team captain. On February 3, 2017, Vecchione became Union's all time Division I leading scorer when he recorded his 158th and 159th career point in a 5–3 loss to Cornell. As a result of his breakout season, Vecchione was named a Hobey Baker Award finalist and the ECAC Hockey Player of the Year. He was also named to the All-ECAC Hockey First Team and won Union's William M. Jaffe Award for most outstanding male student-athlete. On June 21, Vecchione was named an AHCA East First-Team All-American.

Professional
Vecchione signed a one-year entry-level contract with the Philadelphia Flyers on March 31, 2017. He made his NHL debut on April 4, 2017, in a game against the New Jersey Devils.

On July 1, 2017, Vecchione, as a restricted free agent, accepted a two-year, two-way deal to continue with the Philadelphia Flyers. On September 27, 2017, he was loaned to the Flyers American Hockey League (AHL) affiliate, the Lehigh Valley Phantoms to play the 2017–18 season. During the season, Vecchione was named AHL October Rookie of the Month after he recorded 10 points in 10 games. However, due to an injury on December 9 during a game against the Hershey Bears, he was forced to miss more than two weeks to recover. Despite this, Vecchione concluded his first professional season with 40 points in 65 games.

Vecchione attended the Flyers 2018 Training Camp but was reassigned to the AHL on September 20, 2018.

After parts of three seasons in the Flyers organization, Vecchione left as a free agent to sign on a one-year, two-way contract with the St. Louis Blues on July 1, 2019. He attended the Blues 2019 training camp, before he was placed on waivers and assigned to the AHL to join affiliate, the San Antonio Rampage for the 2019–20 season. He led the Rampage with 21 goals and placed second with 36 points before the season was cancelled due to the COVID-19 pandemic.

As a free agent from the Blues after the conclusion of his contract, Vecchione agreed to a one-year, two-way contract to join the Colorado Avalanche on October 9, 2020. In the shortened 2020–21 season, Vecchione was assigned to AHL affiliate, the Colorado Eagles. Limited to 18 games through injury, Vecchione still contributed with 7 goals and 10 points for the Eagles.

Having concluded his contract with the Avalanche, Vecchione as a free agent signed a one-year, two-way contract with the Washington Capitals on August 5, 2021.

Personal life
Vecchione was born to parents Diane and Joe and grew up in Saugus with his two older siblings, Michelle and Joe.

Career statistics

Awards and honors

References

External links
 

1993 births
Living people
American men's ice hockey centers
Colorado Eagles players
Hershey Bears players
Ice hockey players from Massachusetts
Lehigh Valley Phantoms players
People from Saugus, Massachusetts
Philadelphia Flyers players
San Antonio Rampage players
Sportspeople from Essex County, Massachusetts
Tri-City Storm players
Undrafted National Hockey League players
Union Dutchmen ice hockey players
Washington Capitals players